Westmore Frank Stephens (28 January 1892 – 15 May 1947) was an Australian rules footballer who played with University in the Victorian Football League (VFL).

Family
The son of Westmore William Stephens and Ada Elizabeth Stephens, née Langlands, he was born in Windsor, Victoria on 28 January 1892. He married Lucy May Dawson on 17 September 1918; they had two children, Westmore Roy Stephens (1921-1983), and Joan Margaret Elizabeth Purton, née Stephens. Westmore Frank Stephens died on 15 May 1947.

Education
He attended Scotch College, Melbourne, where he played for the school's First XVIII. He was Scotch's School Captain in 1911.

A resident of Ormond College, he enrolled in medicine at the University of Melbourne in 1912.

He graduated Bachelor of Medicine, Bachelor of Surgery (M.B., B.S.) in 1918.

Football
He played Inter-Varsity football for the University of Melbourne; and was awarded both a full blue in football and a full blue in cricket.

He played his first game for University in the VFL competition, against South Melbourne, on 1 June 1912 (all the press reports have him as "Stevens"). All in all, he played a total of 10 games for University over three seasons (1912-1914); his last match was against Geelong on 16 May 1914. The University team withdrew from the VFL competition prior to the 1915 season.

Military
He enlisted in the First AIF as a medical officer, serving with the Australian Army Medical Corps.

Footnotes

References
 Holmesby, Russell & Main, Jim (2007). The Encyclopedia of AFL Footballers. 7th ed. Melbourne: Bas Publishing.
 World War One Service Record: Captain Westmore Frank Stephens, National Archives of Australia.

External links

 First World War Embarkation Roll: Captain Westmore Frank Stephens A.A.M.C., Australian War Memorial. 
 First World War Nominal Roll: Captain Westmore Frank Stephens A.A.M.C., Australian War Memorial.

1892 births
Australian rules footballers from Melbourne
University Football Club players
People educated at Scotch College, Melbourne
University of Melbourne alumni
Australian Army officers
Medical doctors from Melbourne
1947 deaths
Australian military personnel of World War I
People from Windsor, Victoria
Military personnel from Melbourne